In mathematics, a Bose–Mesner algebra is a special set of matrices which arise from a combinatorial structure known as an association scheme, together with the usual set of rules for combining (forming the products of) those matrices, such that they form an associative algebra, or, more precisely, a unitary commutative algebra. Among these rules are:
the result of a product is also within the set of matrices,
there is an identity matrix in the set, and
taking products is commutative.

Bose–Mesner algebras have applications in physics to spin models, and in statistics to the design of experiments. They are named for R. C. Bose and Dale Marsh Mesner.

Definition
Let X be a set of v elements. Consider a partition of the 2-element subsets of X into n non-empty subsets, R1, ..., Rn such that:
This number will be denoted by vi, and
This structure is enhanced by adding all pairs of repeated elements of X and collecting them in a subset R0. This enhancement permits the parameters i, j, and k to take on the value of zero, and lets some of x,y or z be equal.

A set with such an enhanced partition is called an association scheme. One may view an association scheme as a partition of the edges of a complete graph (with vertex set X) into n classes, often thought of as color classes. In this representation, there is a loop at each vertex and all the loops receive the same 0th color.

The association scheme can also be represented algebraically. Consider the matrices Di defined by:
 

Let  be the vector space consisting of all matrices , with  complex.

  is symmetric,
  (the all-ones matrix),
 
 

The (x,y)-th entry of the left side of 4. is the number of two colored paths of length two joining x and y (using "colors" i and j) in the graph. Note that the rows and columns of  contain  1s:

 

From 1., these matrices are symmetric. From 4.,  is closed under multiplication, and multiplication is always associative. This associative commutative algebra  is called the Bose–Mesner algebra of the association scheme. This means that  is semi-simple and has a unique basis of primitive idempotents . These are complex n × n matrices satisfying

 

 

 

The Bose–Mesner algebra has two distinguished bases: the basis consisting of the adjacency matrices , and the basis consisting of the irreducible idempotent matrices . By definition, there exist well-defined complex numbers such that

 

and

 

The p-numbers , and the q-numbers , play a prominent role in the theory. They satisfy well-defined orthogonality relations. The p-numbers are the eigenvalues of the adjacency matrix .

Theorem

 

 

Also

 

In matrix notation, these are

 

 

where

Proof of theorem

This implies that

 

which proves Equation  and Equation ,

 

There is an analogy between extensions of association schemes and extensions of finite fields. The cases we are most interested in are those where the extended schemes are defined on the -th Cartesian power  of a set  on which a basic association scheme  is defined. The Kronecker power corresponds to the polynomial ring  first defined on a field , while the extension scheme corresponds to the extension field obtained as a quotient. An example of such an extended scheme is the Hamming scheme.

Association schemes may be merged, but merging them leads to non-symmetric association schemes, whereas all usual codes are subgroups in symmetric Abelian schemes.

See also
 Association scheme

Notes

References
 
 
 
 
 
 
 
 
 

Algebraic combinatorics
Design of experiments
Analysis of variance
Representation theory
Algebra